AR7, AR 7, or AR-7 may refer to:
ArmaLite AR-7, a .22 caliber semi-automatic survival rifle
Arkansas Highway 7 (AR 7)  is a north–south state highway that runs across the state.
Arkansas's 7th congressional district, an obsolete district
Texas Instruments AR7 is a fully integrated single-chip ADSL CPE access router solution.
Thyroid hormone receptor alpha (AR7), a nuclear receptor protein
USS Hector (AR-7), a repair ship of the US Navy